T. microphyllum may refer to:
 Tanacetum microphyllum, a plant species found in Spain and Portugal
 Tetrorchidium microphyllum, a plant species endemic to Panama

See also
 Microphyllum